The 2021 season was Northern Diamonds' second season, in which they competed in the 50 over Rachael Heyhoe Flint Trophy and the new Twenty20 competition, the Charlotte Edwards Cup, finishing as runners-up in both competitions. The side finished second in the group stage of the Rachael Heyhoe Flint Trophy, therefore progressing to the play-off, where they beat Central Sparks by 6 wickets. In the final, they played Southern Vipers in a repeat of the previous year's final. Batting first, Diamonds made 183, but lost by 3 wickets after reducing Vipers to 109/7.

In the Charlotte Edwards Cup, the side topped Group B of the competition, winning four of their six matches. They then played Southern Vipers in the semi-final on Finals Day, beating them by 18 runs to progress to the final against South East Stars. Diamonds made 138/4 batting first in the final, but this was chased down by the Stars with 2 overs to spare.
 
The side was captained by Hollie Armitage and coached by Danielle Hazell. They played their home matches at four grounds across the North East: the Riverside Ground, Headingley, South Northumberland Cricket Club and the North Marine Road Ground.

Squad
Northern Diamonds announced their initial 18-player squad on 26 May 2021. On 10 June 2021, Sarah Taylor was signed as a short-term replacement for the injured Bess Heath. Age given is at the start of Northern Diamonds' first match of the season (29 May 2021).

Rachael Heyhoe Flint Trophy

Season standings

 Advanced to the final
 Advanced to the play-off

Fixtures

Play-off

Final

Tournament statistics

Batting

Source: ESPN Cricinfo Qualification: 100 runs.

Bowling

Source: ESPN Cricinfo Qualification: 5 wickets.

Charlotte Edwards Cup

Group B

 Advanced to the semi-final

Fixtures

Semi-final

Final

Tournament statistics

Batting

Source: ESPN Cricinfo Qualification: 50 runs.

Bowling

Source: ESPN Cricinfo Qualification: 5 wickets.

Season statistics

Batting

Bowling

Fielding

Wicket-keeping

References

Northern Diamonds seasons
2021 in English women's cricket